Grey Room is a peer-reviewed academic journal published quarterly, in print and online, by the MIT Press. Founded in 2000, it includes work in the fields of architecture, art, media, and politics. To date it has featured contributions by such prominent historians and theorists as Yve-Alain Bois, Judith Butler, Georges Canguilhem, Hubert Damisch, Friedrich Kittler, Chantal Mouffe, Antonio Negri, Paolo Virno, Paul Virilio, and Samuel Weber. 

Beginning with issue #51, the composition of the editorial board changed.  Founding editors Branden Joseph, Reinhold Martin, and Felicity Scott, and editors Karen Beckman and Tom McDonough, resigned from the editorial board after issue #50 and assumed roles on the advisory board of the journal.  Zeynep Çelik Alexander, Lucia Allais, Eric de Bruyn, Gabriella Coleman (since resigned from the editorial board), Noam M. Elcott, John Harwood, Byron Hamann, and Matthew C. Hunter have served as editors since.

External links 
Official website

Architecture journals
MIT Press academic journals
Quarterly journals
Publications established in 2000
English-language journals